Pastor Castro Rojas was the 12th Mayor of the commune of Pichilemu, office which he held between July and November 1930. He left the office because of poor health.

Political career
Castro Rojas, a long-time resident of Rancagua, current capital of the Region of O'Higgins, was appointed mayor of the junta de vecinos (neighbors' council) of Pichilemu by decree of President Carlos Ibáñez del Campo, on 12 July 1930. Throughout his term, there were no vocales in the municipal council. Because of poor health, he resigned the mayorship on 24 November 1930.

References

Year of birth missing
Year of death missing
People from Rancagua
Mayors of Pichilemu